Nicole Arendt and Manon Bollegraf were the defending champions and won in the final 6–1, 3–6, 7–5 against Rachel McQuillan and Nana Miyagi.

Seeds
Champion seeds are indicated in bold text while text in italics indicates the round in which those seeds were eliminated.

 Nicole Arendt /  Manon Bollegraf (champions)
 Lori McNeil /  Larisa Savchenko (semifinals)
 Gigi Fernández /  Patricia Tarabini (quarterfinals)
 Yayuk Basuki /  Caroline Vis (quarterfinals)

Draw

External links
 1997 World Doubles Cup Draw

WTA Doubles Championships
1997 WTA Tour